The Toronto Blue Jays are a Major League Baseball (MLB) team based in Toronto, Ontario. They play in the American League East division. The Blue Jays first played their home games at Exhibition Stadium until , when they moved into the SkyDome, which was renamed Rogers Centre in 2005. The first game of the new baseball season for a team is played on Opening Day, and being named the Opening Day starter is an honour, which is often given to the player who is expected to lead the pitching staff that season, though there are various strategic reasons why a team's best pitcher might not start on Opening Day. The Blue Jays have used 25 different Opening Day starting pitchers in their 43 seasons. The 25 starters have a combined Opening Day record of 15 wins, 16 losses and 12 no decisions. No decisions are only awarded to the starting pitcher if the game is won or lost after the starting pitcher has left the game.

The Blue Jays first Opening Day starting pitcher was Bill Singer, who received a no decision against the Chicago White Sox. Halladay also has the most starts at home with four. Dave Lemanczyk has the worst winning percentage as the Opening Day starting pitcher with a record of 0–2, both of which were pitched away from Exhibition Stadium.

Overall, the Blue Jays' Opening Day starting pitchers have a record of 0 wins and 1 loss at Exhibition Stadium, and 6 wins and 4 losses at SkyDome/Rogers Centre. In addition, although the Blue Jays were nominally the home team on Opening Day 2001, the game was played in Hiram Bithorn Stadium in Hato Rey, Puerto Rico. Esteban Loaiza started the game in Hato Rey and won, making the Blue Jays' Opening Day starting pitchers' combined home record 6 wins and 4 losses, and their away record 6 wins and 9 losses. The Blue Jays went on to play in the American League Championship Series playoff games in 1985, 1989 and 1991, and won the World Series in 1992 and 1993. Dave Stieb, Jimmy Key and Jack Morris were the Opening Day starting pitchers those years, and had a combined Opening Day record of 2 wins and 3 losses.

The Blue Jays and the Cleveland Indians currently hold the record for the longest Opening Day game in Major League history. They set that record on Opening Day 2012, when Jairo Asencio of the Indians gave up a 3-run home run in the top of the 16th inning to give the Blue Jays the win. This broke the record of 15 innings set between the Indians and the Detroit Tigers in 1960.

The Blue Jays would later participate in the ALCS in 2015 and 2016.

Key

Pitchers

References

 
Lists of Major League Baseball Opening Day starting pitchers
Opening Day starting pitchers